Group A of the 1978 FIFA World Cup was one of two groups of nations competing for the De facto semifinals  the 1978 FIFA World Cup. The group's first round of matches began on 14 June and its last matches were played on 21 June. All six group matches were played either at the Estadio Chateau Carreras in Córdoba, or the Estadio Monumental in the capital Buenos Aires. The group consisted of West Germany (the Defending Champions) as well as the Netherlands (the former runners up), Italy and Austria. The Netherlands advanced to the final match, and Italy advanced to the third place match.

Qualified teams
The winners of Group 1 and 3 and the runners-up of Group 2 and 4 qualified for Group A of the second round.

Standings

Matches

Austria vs Netherlands
After an unconvincing group stage performance the Netherlands knew they had to play better if they were to qualify for the finals, and took on surprise qualifiers Austria in their first game. They started well when an unmarked Ernie Brandts headed in Arie Haan's free kick. The Dutch then won a penalty kick after Gerhard Breitenberger fouled Wim Jansen and Rob Rensenbrink neatly scored. Rensenbrink then took advantage of some poor defending to provide assist for Johnny Rep to score on either side of half time. Austria which created several chances and were unlucky to score in the first half got one back in the eightieth minute when defender Erich Obermayer scored a brilliant lob over the Dutch goalkeeper for a goal. The Dutch weren't to be deterred as Rensenbrink provided yet another assist this time Willy van de Kerkhof to score just two minutes later.

Italy vs West Germany

Netherlands vs West Germany

This highly anticipated match was a repeat of the 1974 FIFA World Cup Final, with the Netherlands fielding six players who had played that day and West Germany four. The match official Ramón Barreto of Uruguay coincidentally had also been one of the linesmen at the 1974 final.

The 1974 final had started with the Dutch scoring within two minutes, and in this match there was another early goal, although it went the Germans' way. The Dutch goaltender Piet Schrijvers could only parry Rainer Bonhof's free kick right into the path of Rüdiger Abramczik, who headed home. The Netherlands equalized around the thirty-minute mark when Arie Haan let fly from 35 yards and into the top corner.

Knowing a draw would be enough Netherlands refrained from taking chances in the second half. Against the run of play West Germany were awarded a soft free-kick, the Dutch were complaining with the referee and did not keep their concentration Erich Beer crossed for Dieter Müller to power in a header. The goal gave the Netherlands the momentum to score though and eight minutes from time René van de Kerkhof took a pass from his twin brother Willy, cut inside a defender and smashed home. There would be a few more chances as Johnny Rep hit the woodwork and Schrijvers was forced to save from Beer.

The match ended in bizarre fashion, with substitute Dick Nanninga shown a yellow card for an off the ball incident and then seconds later referee Barreto showing the same player a red card for apparently laughing at the decision to give him a card. It took five minutes to restore order on the field as the bewildered Nanninga was led off.

Italy vs Austria

Austria vs West Germany

Italy vs Netherlands
This match was a semifinal in all but name with the winner being assured a place in the final, although the Netherlands could advance with a draw and a Germany draw or loss. Italy started the positive and scored when Ernie Brandts in an attempt to stop Roberto Bettega only succeeded in putting the ball into his own net. The goal would have consequences for the Netherlands as Piet Schrijvers was injured on the play and had to be stretchered off for Jan Jongbloed. Italy dominated the remainder of the first half. In a physical match Johnny Rep was cautioned for fouling Romeo Benetti, who was later to pick up a yellow card himself for fouling Rensenbrink, meaning the Italian defender would miss the final should Italy reach it. Early in the second half Arie Haan was cautioned for a challenge on Marco Tardelli who later also picked up a yellow card meaning he too would miss Italy's next match. Some felt that Antonio Cabrini's challenge on Haan many felt warranted a red card, not just a yellow. Shortly after half time Brandts, who had earlier scored an own goal, blasted home a shot to equalize. Then fourteen minutes from time Haan hit an audacious shot 30 yards out that went off Zoff's left post and into the net.

References

Groups
G
Group
Group
Group